is a Japanese vocal and electronics performer, composer, and instrument builder.

He has performed and recorded with artists such as Jaap Blonk, Nicolas Collins, Carl Stone, Noah Creshevsky, Yuji Takahashi, Toshi Ichiyanagi, Ute Wassermann, Jennifer Walshe, Zbigniew Karkowski, Butch Morris, Otomo Yoshihide. Adachi directed Japan's premiere of John Cage's Europera V and Variations VII. He was invited by Asian Cultural Council to New York from 2009 to 2010 and was a guest of the DAAD Berliner Künstlerprogramm in 2012.

References

External links
 
 UbuWeb Tomomi Adachi
 Pennsound Tomomi Adachi
 Tomomi Adachi performing 'infrared sensor shirt' video by Louisiana Channel

1972 births
20th-century classical composers
20th-century Japanese composers
20th-century Japanese male musicians
21st-century classical composers
21st-century Japanese composers
21st-century Japanese musicians
21st-century Japanese male musicians
Japanese classical composers
Japanese experimental musicians
Japanese male classical composers
Living people
People from Kanazawa, Ishikawa